Iván Ania Cadavieco (born 24 October 1977 in Oviedo, Asturias) is a Spanish former professional footballer who played as an attacking midfielder, currently manager of Algeciras CF.

Managerial statistics

Honours
Spain U18
UEFA European Under-18 Championship: 1995

References

External links

Stats and biography at Cadistas1910 

 

1977 births
Living people
Spanish footballers
Footballers from Oviedo
Association football midfielders
La Liga players
Segunda División players
Segunda División B players
Tercera División players
Real Oviedo Vetusta players
Real Oviedo players
CD Tenerife players
Rayo Vallecano players
Gimnàstic de Tarragona footballers
Cádiz CF players
Lorca Deportiva CF footballers
CD Covadonga players
Spain youth international footballers
Spain under-21 international footballers
Spanish football managers
Segunda División managers
Segunda División B managers
Tercera División managers
Primera Federación managers
Real Oviedo Vetusta managers
Racing de Santander managers
Algeciras CF managers